Mactridae, common name the trough shells or duck clams, is a family of saltwater clams, marine bivalve mollusks in the order Venerida.

Description
These clams have two short siphons, each with a horny sheath. The shell is shaped like a rounded-cornered equilateral triangle and there is a slight gape at the posterior. Each valve bears two cardinal teeth with four lateral teeth on the right valve and two on the left. The foot is white and wedge-shaped. They mostly inhabit the neritic zone.

Ecology
Trough shells burrow in sand or fine gravel and never in muddy substrates.

Genera

According to the World Register of Marine Species (2012), this family contains 37 genera:
 Anatina Schumacher, 1817
 Austromactra Iredale, 1930
 Barymactra Cossmann in Cossmann & Peyrot, 1909
 Coelomactra Dall, 1895
 Crassula Marwick, 1948
 Cyclomactra Dall, 1895
 Darina Gray, 1853
 Diaphoromactra Iredale, 1930
 Eastonia Gray, 1853
 Harvella Gray, 1853
 Heterocardia Deshayes, 1855
 Huberimactra Cosel & Gofas, 2018
 Leptospisula Dall, 1895
 Lutraria Lamarck, 1799
 Mactra Linnaeus, 1767
 Mactrellona Marks, 1915
 Mactrinula Gray, 1853
 Mactromeris Conrad, 1868
 Mactrotoma Dall, 1894
 Maorimactra Finlay, 1928
 Meropesta Iredale, 1929
 Mulinia Gray, 1837
 Oxyperas Mörch, 1853
Pseudocardium Gabb, 1866 
 Raeta Gray, 1853
 Rangia Desmoulins, 1832
 Resania Gray, 1853
 Scalpomactra Finlay [in Marwick], 1928
 Scissodesma Gray, 1837
 Simomactra Dall, 1894
 Spisula Gray, 1837
 Standella Gray, 1853
 Tanysiphon Benson, 1858
 Tresus Gray, 1853
 Trinitasia Maury, 1928
 Tumbeziconcha Pilsbry & Olsson, 1935
 Zenatia Gray, 1853
 Zenatina Gill & Darragh, 1963

References

 Powell A. W. B., New Zealand Mollusca, William Collins Publishers Ltd, Auckland, New Zealand 1979 

 
Bivalve families
Taxa named by Jean-Baptiste Lamarck
Extant Cretaceous first appearances